Licet Hernández (born 14 April 1993) is a Cuban rower. She competed in the women's lightweight double sculls event at the 2016 Summer Olympics.

She was also scheduled to compete in the 2017 World Rowing Championships in Sarasota, Florida but never appeared at her scheduled competition. The Sarasota County Sheriff's Office reported her as a missing person since her disappearance.

References

External links
 

1993 births
Living people
Cuban female rowers
Olympic rowers of Cuba
Rowers at the 2016 Summer Olympics
Place of birth missing (living people)
Pan American Games medalists in rowing
Pan American Games silver medalists for Cuba
Rowers at the 2015 Pan American Games
Medalists at the 2015 Pan American Games